STV Player is a video on demand service owned by STV Group and available free-of-charge across the UK, online, on mobile and on all major TV platforms, including Sky Glass, Amazon Fire TV, Roku, Apple TV, Android TV, Freeview Play and Virgin Media. 

Officially launched in July 2009 following a soft launch the previous year, STV Player was initially established as an online catch-up service for viewers of the STV channel in Scotland. The platform has since rolled out UK-wide as an advertising-based video on demand (AVOD) service with a focus on international drama box sets. In February 2019, STV Player+ was launched, allowing viewers with a monthly subscription to stream and download Player content without pre-roll or mid-roll advertising.

In January 2021, after launching on Sky Q in all four nations of the UK the previous month, STV Player reported that its monthly active user base had grown by a fifth and online viewing on the platform had doubled year-on-year. It was nominated for "best on demand service of the year" at the Edinburgh International Television Festival's annual awards ceremony in 2021.

Programming
STV Player provides a combination of Channel 3 network content such as Coronation Street, The Masked Singer and I'm a Celebrity...Get Me Out of Here!, home-grown productions such as Scotland Tonight and Taggart, and international drama box sets including The Bridge, Janet King and Ice. Channel 3 network content is not available to viewers outside Scotland, as ITVX owns the rights to show this in ITV plc regions.

In April 2020, STV announced plans to provide every episode of classic soap opera Take the High Road, produced by its production arm STV Studios between 1980 and 2003, on STV Player.

A content deal with distributor Banijay in July 2021, described at the time as STV Player's "biggest ever", brought over 1,200 hours of new drama and factual programming to the platform for viewers across the UK.

In January 2023, STV Player signed a deal with distributor All3Media to become the first streaming service to provide every episode of classic soap Brookside since it was cancelled by Channel 4 in 2003. Original cast members Claire Sweeney and Sunetra Sarker praised the decision to relaunch the show on STV Player.

Capacity issues 
In April 2014, STV Player experienced downtime during its broadcast of Salmond & Darling: The Debate—the first televised debate for the 2014 Scottish independence referendum. STV had secured exclusive rights to the broadcast, and refused to offer it to any other broadcaster (including the BBC and Sky News), while STV's network ITV did not choose to pick up the live airing of the debate across the rest of the UK (excluding the ITV Border region), leading to higher-than-anticipated demand for the internet stream. STV apologized for the capacity problems, while BBC Parliament aired the full debate broadcast the next day.

Supported platforms 

The website uses Brightcove Flash technology, similar to those used by the services provided by the BBC and Channel 4. It is available on various operating systems, including Windows, Mac and Linux, and multiple internet browsers, such as Chrome, Firefox  and Safari.

An Android app was released on 9 September 2011, and iOS on 22 December 2011. 

STV Player launched on Freesat in October 2016, and on Sky UK in November 2019.

In December 2020, it was announced that STV Player would be installed on Now TV devices, automatically appear on the home screens for all users. At the same time STV Player becomes available UK wide to Sky Q customers. 

STV launched UK wide on the Virgin Media platform in June 2020

References

External links

2009 establishments in Scotland
2009 establishments in the United Kingdom
Android (operating system) software
Archives in Scotland
Internet properties established in 2009
Internet television channels
iOS software
Linux software
macOS software
Media players
Scottish websites
STV Group
Television websites
Video on demand services
Windows media players